"The Blast" is a hip hop single from Reflection Eternal's debut album, Train of Thought. It features rapping from the duo's emcee, Talib Kweli, as well as from its producer, DJ Hi-Tek. It is the only Reflection Eternal song that Hi-Tek raps on, and like all Reflection Eternal songs, he produces it. The song has a somber and jazzy beat backed by vocals from Vinia Mojica. It has a music video directed by Little X in which Kweli and Hi-Tek are rapping in a rainstorm. Yasiin Bey aka Mos Def, Pharaohe Monch and Kweli's grandmother, Javotti Greene make cameo appearances.  The music video version is extended in length, and gives Talib Kweli an extra verse. The song peaked at #2 on the Billboard Hot Rap Tracks and #49 on the Hot R&B/Hip-Hop Songs. The official remix features new verses by Talib Kweli as well as neo-soul singer Erykah Badu.

Single track list

12-inch single

A-Side
 The Blast (Clean)
 The Blast (Dirty)
 The Blast (Instrumental)

B-Side
 Down for the Count (Solo Version / Dirty)
 Down for the Count (Solo Version / Instrumental)
 Train of Thought (Clean)
 Train of Thought (Instrumental)

CD single
 The Blast
 Down for the Count
 Train of Thought

See also
List of Talib Kweli songs

References

2001 singles
Music videos directed by Director X
Talib Kweli songs
1999 songs
Priority Records singles
Songs written by Hi-Tek
Songs written by Talib Kweli
Songs written by Vinia Mojica
Rawkus Records singles